Géza  (1150s – after 1191) was a Hungarian royal prince and the youngest son of the King Géza II of Hungary. Prince Géza was brother to the Kings Stephen III and Béla III of Hungary. He was a pretender to the Hungarian throne against Béla III, but he was imprisoned from 1177 to 1189. He traveled to the Holy Land during the  Third Crusade with an army of 2,000 Hungarian warriors.

Background 
Prince Géza was born in the early 1150s, the third son of King Géza II of Hungary and his wife, Princess Euphrosyne of Kiev. In near-contemporary German chronicles – for instance, Alberic of Trois-Fontaines –, he was also referred to as "Guithardus" or "Gotthard". After King Géza II died, there were several conflicts over the royal succession. Géza's elder brother was crowned Stephen III of Hungary after their father's death in 1162, but two brothers of King Géza II briefly seized the crown, reigning as Ladislaus II and Stephen IV of Hungary. Stephen III defeated his uncle in battle in 1163, regaining the control over the whole kingdom.

During the reign of Stephen III, the wars against the Byzantine Empire continued. Byzantine emperor, Manuel I Komnenos, had previously competed with Géza II on many occasions, as he was determined to expand his influence over Hungary. Manuel I's mother was Saint Piroska of Hungary, daughter of Saint Ladislaus I of Hungary, and he always had a great interest in the internal affairs of Hungary. Manuel I and Stephen III eventually resolved this through a peace accord signed in 1163, in which the Hungarian King's younger brother Béla, was to be sent to Constantinople in surety. During Stephen III's rule, he kept his mother Euphrosyne, and his youngest brother, Prince Géza, at court.

Pretender 
After Stephen III's death in March 1172, his next eldest brother, Prince Béla, was recalled from Constantinople to ascend the throne and forestall any attempt at accession by his younger brother, Prince Géza.

Within a few months, the arriving prince was crowned Béla III of Hungary on 13 January 1173 but faced opposition from his own mother, the Queen Dowager, and his brother, Prince Géza, who began conspiring against him to obtain the Crown of Hungary. Lucas, Archbishop of Esztergom, who refused to perform the coronation, delaying the ceremony for almost a year, also supported the aspirations of Géza, who aimed to continue the anti-Byzantine and pro-papal policies of Stephen III. Despite that Béla's claim – beside the Byzantine Empire – was supported by Pope Alexander III too, and it is plausible that Géza and his domestic supporters sought assistance from the rival Holy Roman Empire at the turn of 1172 and 1173, but Frederick I, Holy Roman Emperor was fully engaged with his Italian and Polish campaigns during that time. After a couple of failed attempts, Béla III had them arrested in 1174. He imprisoned his mother too, but Prince Géza and his several partisans – including Lawrence and possibly Stephen, Archbishop of Kalocsa) – escaped from captivity and fled to the court of Henry II, Duke of Austria in 1174 or 1175 to seek protection. When Henry refused to extradite Géza, Béla launched plundering raids into Austria, together with Soběslav II, Duke of Bohemia. A year later, Prince Géza tried to persuade Soběslav II of Bohemia to help him meet Frederick I, Holy Roman Emperor, but Soběslav seized Géza and handed him over to Béla in 1177.

Béla once again imprisoned his brother, and he also put their mother, Euphrosyne, in confinement, while a certain ispán Vata was blinded. Prince Géza languished in prison from 1177 to 1189. Euphrosyne was set free in 1186, but she was obliged to leave the kingdom for Constantinople, while Géza remained in captivity. Freedom arrived for him in 1189 due to preparations for the Third Crusade. That year, Frederick Barbarossa, arrived in Hungary and was received by King Béla III. Learning of Prince Géza's predicament via Béla's second spouse Margaret of France, the Holy Roman Emperor asked Béla III to allow the imprisoned Géza to lead a small Hungarian army to the Crusade as an escort, according to Arnold of Lübeck. Béla III allowed this, and 2,000 Hungarian soldiers left for the Holy Land under the leadership of Géza and Bishop Ugrin Csák.

Later life 
Shortly after, Béla III ordered the Hungarian contingent to return from Niš to Hungary, because he did not want to confront with his son-in-law, Emperor Isaac II Angelos, who embroiled conflict with the Holy Roman Emperor during the early phase of the Third Crusade. While the majority of the army led by Ugrin Csák, including six ispáns returned to Hungary, Géza and his small escort, including three ispáns (barons) remained in the crusader army, and participated in the subsequent battles and sieges. Géza settled down in the Byzantine Empire after the death of Emperor Frederick. It is known that Géza took a Byzantine noblewoman (possibly from the ruling Angelos dynasty) as wife between 1190 and 1191. According to a Greek codex kept in the Saint Catherine's Monastery, translated  by historian Szabolcs de Vajay, Géza adopted the name Ioannes (John) in the Byzantine Empire. Géza was the uncle of Empress Margaret, the consort of Emperor Isaac II Angelos. It is possible that Géza integrated into the Byzantine elite through her assistance and financial support.

His sons – one of them, Géza–Alexios is known by name – first appeared in contemporary sources in 1210, it is plausible that Géza had died by then. In that year, a group of discontented Hungarian lords during the conspiracy (1209–10) offered the crown to them against their cousin, the ruling monarch Andrew II of Hungary; they lived in "Greek land". However, their envoys were captured by Domald of Sidraga in Split in 1210. Years later, when Andrew II decided to return to Hungary from the Fifth Crusade in early 1218, the troops of Géza's sons attacked his army when he stayed in Nicaea (now İznik, Turkey).

References

Sources 

1150s births
12th-century Hungarian people
Christians of the Third Crusade
House of Árpád
Hungarian princes
Hungarian prisoners and detainees
Prisoners and detainees of Hungary
Escapees from Hungarian detention
Year of death uncertain
Pretenders to the Hungarian throne
Sons of kings